Gonzo Papers, Vol. 3: Songs of the Doomed: More Notes on the Death of the American Dream is a book by the American writer and journalist Hunter S. Thompson, originally published in 1990. This third installment of The Gonzo Papers is a chronologically arranged selection of stories, letters, journals and reporting, allowing readers to see how Thompson's brand of "new journalism," also termed Gonzo journalism,  has evolved over the years. It is a collection of Dr. Thompson's essays and articles. This collection is mostly made up of pieces from the Reagan Era, but there are also some older stories, including excerpts from his unfinished first novel, "Prince Jellyfish", which is still unpublished, and The Rum Diary, which was not published on its own until 1998.

Dedication page 
To David McCumber and Rosalie Sorrells:

"When the going gets weird,

the weird turn pro"

-HST

The first edition carries a dedication to his editorial assistant during the writing of the book:

Content 
Because Songs of the Doomed is a collection of essays, short stories, and hard-to-find newspaper articles written by Thompson during his extensive career, the book is separated into five distinct sections, each named after a decade the writer himself survived: The Fifties: Last Rumble in Fat City, The Sixties: What the Hell? It's Only Rock and Roll..., The Seventies: Reaping the Whirlwind, Riding the Tiger, The Eighties: How Much Money Do You Have?, and Welcome to the Nineties: Welcome to Jail, respectively.

Having the essays, stories, and articles included in the book in order by decade allows readers to take an unlikely look into how the author's style (and personal habits) changed over the course of his career.  Of course, it also allows us to look more deeply into the political, cultural and social atmosphere of each time period, all through the eyes of one ever-changing man.

Author's Note
Let the Trials Begin /
Electricity /
Last Train from Camelot /
Note from Ralph Steadman

The Fifties: Last Rumble in Fat City
Tarred and Feathered at the Jersey Shore /
Saturday Night at the Riviera /
Prince Jellyfish /
Fleeing New York

The Sixties: What the Hell?  It's Only Rock and Roll...
Letter to Angus Cameron /
The Rum Diary /
Revisited:  The Puerto Rican Problem /
The Kennedy Assassination /
Back to the U.S.A. /
Hell's Angels: Long Nights, Ugly Days, Orgy of the Doomed /
Midnight on the Coast Highway /
Ken Kesey: Walking with the Kind /
LSD-25:  Res Ipsa Loquitor /
Chicago 1968: Death to the Weird /
First Visit with Mescalito

The Seventies: Reaping the Whirlwind, Riding the Tiger
Iguana Project /
Never Apologize, Never Explain /
Vegas Witchcraft /
High-Water Mark /
Fear and Loathing /
Lies /
Ed Muskie Doomed by Ibogaine /
Washington Politics /
Summit Conference in Elko: Secret Gathering of the Power Elite /
Opening Statement: HST /
Rolling Stone: Abandon All Hope Ye Who Enter Here /
Dance of the Doomed /
Checking into the Lane Xang /
Whooping it up with the War Junkies /
Confidential Memo to Colonel Vo Don Giang /
Memo to Jim Silberman on the Death of the American Dream /
Letter to Russell Chatham

The Eighties: How Much Money Do You Have?
Welcome to the 80's /
Love on the Palm Beach Express /
Sugarloaf Key /
The Silk Road /
Letter to Ralph Steadman /
Letter to Ken Kesey /
Last Memo from the National Affairs Desk /
Memo from the Sports Desk /
Wild Sex in Sausalito /
The Dukakis Problem: Another vicious beating for the New Whigs /
Secret Cables to Willie Hearst /
San Francisco Examiner Columns /
The New Dumb /
Fear and Loathing in Sacramento /
Whiskey Business /
I knew the Bride When She Used to Rock and Roll /
Community of Whores /
Return to the Riviera Cafe /
Avery: Making Sense of the 60's /
German Decade: Rise of the Fourth Reich /
Turbo Must Die /
Memo to Jay Johnson /
Warning Issued on Cocaine

Welcome to the Nineties: Welcome to Jail

Literary criticism 
Jerry Stratton wrote of Songs of the Doomed on the Mimsy Book Review site:

Memorable quotes 

I wandered into a library last week and decided to do a quick bit of reading on The Law, which has caused me some trouble recently.  It was a cold, mean day, and my mood was not much different.  The library was empty at that hour of the morning. ...It was closed, in fact, but not locked.  So I went in.

These are bad times for people who like to sit outside the library at dawn on a rainy morning and get ripped to the tits on crank and powerful music.

We spent the next six hours in a tiny concrete cell with about twenty Puerto Ricans.  We couldn't sit down because they had pissed all over the floor, so we stood in the middle of the room, giving out cigarettes like representatives of the Red Cross.  They were a dangerous-looking lot.  Some were drunk and others seemed crazy.  I felt safe as long as we could supply them with cigarettes, but I wondered what would happen when we ran out.

In a passage from Hell's Angels: Long Nights, Ugly Days, Orgy of the Doomed... Thompson sums up his fascination with the world of writing:
I found out then that writing is a kind of therapy.  One of the few ways I can almost be certain I'll understand something is by sitting down and writing about it.  Because by forcing yourself to write about it and putting it down in words, you can't avoid having to come to grips with it.  You might be wrong, but you have to think about it very intensely to write about it.  So I use writing as a learning tool.

Notes 

1990 non-fiction books
Essay collections by Hunter S. Thompson
Simon & Schuster books
Reagan Era